William Beauford Fields (6 August 1929 – 20 November 1992) was an American competition rower and Olympic champion, and later naval officer. He was born in Forsyth, Georgia.

Fields won a gold medal in coxed eights at the 1952 Summer Olympics, as a member of the American team.

References

1929 births
1992 deaths
People from Forsyth, Georgia
Rowers at the 1952 Summer Olympics
Olympic gold medalists for the United States in rowing
Sportspeople from Georgia (U.S. state)
American male rowers
Medalists at the 1952 Summer Olympics